David Bowie recorded twelve radio sessions for the BBC between 1967 and 1972. Many of the tracks – but not all – were released on the Bowie at the Beeb 2-CD Set (2000). Some of the tracks missing from the first few sessions not included on Bowie at the Beeb 2-CD Set appear on later editions of David Bowie (1967) and David Bowie (1969). A few more tracks appear on BBC Sessions 1969–1972 (Sampler) [1996]; Bowie at the Beeb 4-LP Edition [2016]). However, many of the missing tracks from the Bowie at the Beeb 2-CD Set are only available on bootlegs and online.  'Hang Onto Yourself'     from 11 Jan 1972 has,to date, not appeared in either master tape or bootleg form.  This is because many of the original mastertapes are long gone, with sometimes only the broadcast tapes existing, meaning songs that were recorded but not originally broadcast, or only broadcast in edited form, are lost; or in at least one case, only a partial recording of a broadcast exists, with the broadcast tape no longer available. This article gives an overview of all the sessions, along with where they have received their official release.

Top Gear: 18 December 1967
Bowie's first session for BBC Radio was recorded on the 18 December 1967, soon after the release of his first album, David Bowie (1967). The session was recorded at Piccadilly Studios and arranged and performed by Arthur Greenslade and his 16 piece orchestra with Bowie on vocals and playing guitar. The session was produced by Bernie Andrews.

Top Gear: 13 May 1968

Dave Lee Travis Show: 20 October 1969

The Sunday Show [Live]: 5 February 1970

Sound Of The Seventies: 25 March 1970

In Concert [Live]: 3 June 1971
"The date of this session has been widely misquoted as 5 June", writes Pegg "but BBC records and Bowie at the Beeb confirm 3 June is correct".

Sound Of The Seventies: 21 September 1971

Sound Of The Seventies: 11 January 1972

Sound Of The Seventies: 18 January 1972

Sound Of The Seventies: 16 May 1972

Johnnie Walker Lunchtime Show: 22 May 1972

Sound Of The Seventies: 23 May 1972

References

General

O'Leary, Chris, Rebel Rebel: All the Songs of David Bowie from '64 to '76, Zero Books, 2015 
Pegg, Nicholas, The Complete David Bowie: Expanded and Updated Seventh Edition, Titan Books, 2016 
 Complete overview of BBC Sessions at the Illustrated db Discography

Specific

David Bowie
BBC music